Pseudofusicoccum ardesiacum is an endophytic fungus that might be a canker pathogen, specifically for Adansonia gibbosa (baobab). It was isolated from said trees, as well as surrounding ones, in the Kimberley (Western Australia).

References

Further reading
Sakalidis, Monique L., Giles E. StJ Hardy, and Treena I. Burgess. "Endophytes as potential pathogens of the baobab species Adansonia gregorii: a focus on the Botryosphaeriaceae." Fungal Ecology 4.1 (2011): 1–14.
Sakalidis, Monique L., et al. "Pathogenic Botryosphaeriaceae associated with Mangifera indica in the Kimberley region of Western Australia." European journal of plant pathology 130.3 (2011): 379–391.
Burgess, T. I., et al. "Movement of pathogens between horticultural crops and endemic trees in the Kimberleys." (2009): 36.

External links 
MycoBank

Botryosphaeriales